Samir Lagsir (born 20 May 2003) is a Dutch professional footballer who plays as a midfielder for Dutch club PEC Zwolle.

Club career
On 10 September 2019, Lagsir signed his first professional contract with PEC Zwolle. Lagsir made his debut as a late sub with PEC Zwolle in a 5-1 Eredivisie loss to FC Twente on 31 October 2020.

International career
Born in the Netherlands, Lagsir is of Moroccan descent. He is a youth international for the Netherlands.

References

External links

Ons Oranje U17 Profile

2003 births
Living people
People from Zuidhorn
Dutch footballers
Netherlands youth international footballers
Dutch sportspeople of Moroccan descent
Association football midfielders
Eredivisie players
PEC Zwolle players
Footballers from Groningen (province)